Kompiam Rural LLG is a local-level government (LLG) of Enga Province, Papua New Guinea.

Wards
01. Silim
02. Birip
03. Wapai
04. Sauanda
05. Aiyulites
06. Pomanda
07. Kipilimanda
08. Kompiam Station
09. Imbilik
10. Kaipures
11. Waibukam/Waipukam
12. Kaindan
13. Winikos
14. Laiagam
15. Yamanda
16. Lingenas/Lengenas
17. Rum
18. Paip
19. Pagalilyam
20. Aperas
21. Kiokai
22. Liap
23. Ipmauanda
24. Lapalama
25. Lyiamanda
26. Rudisau
27. Lailam No. 1
28. Keman
29. Paimanda
30. Pulipas
31. Alakul
32. Kaimas
33. Yaumanda
34. Samaremanda
35. Yawalimanda
36. Aipanda
37. Amaimal
38. Makale

References

Local-level governments of Enga Province